Oreixenica is a genus of butterflies in the family Nymphalidae. The genus contains six species.

Species
Oreixenica orichora (Meyrick, 1885) 
Oreixenica ptunarra Couchman, 1953
Oreixenica latialis  Waterhouse & Lyell, 1914
Oreixenica lathoniella (Westwood, [1851])
Oreixenica correae (Olliff, 1890)
Oreixenica kershawi (Miskin, 1876)

References

Satyrini
Butterfly genera